The Seventh Texas Legislature met from November 2, 1857 to February 16, 1858 in its regular session. All members of the House of Representatives and about half of the members of the Senate were elected in 1857.

Sessions
 7th Regular session: November 2, 1857 – February 16, 1858

Party summary

Officers

Senate
 Lieutenant Governor Francis Richard Lubbock, Democrat
 President pro tempore M. D. K. Taylor, Democrat, Regular session
 Samuel A. Maverick, Democrat, Ad interim

House of Representatives
 Speaker of the House
 William S. Taylor, Democrat, 1857–18 January 1858
 Matthew Fielding Locke, Democrat, 18 January 1858–1859

Members
Members of the Seventh Texas Legislature at the beginning of the regular session, November 2, 1857:

Senate

House of Representatives

 Hamilton P. Bee
 John Henry Brown
 Constantine W. Buckley
 James G. Collier, Tyler County
 Isaac N. Dennis
 David Catchings Dickson
 Randolph C. Doom
 Horatio White Fisher
 Lindsay Hagler, San Patricio County
 James Marshall Harrison
 Spearman Holland
 Matthew Fielding Locke, Democrat
 Eli T. Merriman
 José Ángel Navarro
 Moses Fisk Roberts
 William R. Shannon, Democrat
 Charles William Tait
 William S. Taylor, Democrat

Membership Changes

Senate

House of Representatives

Notes

References

External links

07 Texas Legislature
1857 in Texas
1858 in Texas
1857 U.S. legislative sessions
1858 U.S. legislative sessions